Boiga multomaculata, also called the many-spotted cat snake,  large-spotted cat snake and marbled cat-eyed snake, is a species of rear-fanged colubrid snakes.

Description
Dorsally it is gray-brown, with two alternating series of round dark brown, reddish-brown or chestnut-colored spots and two other series of smaller spots on the lower sides. On the head it has two blackish bands which diverge posteriorly. There is a blackish streak from the eye to the corner of the mouth. Ventrally it is whitish, marbled or spotted with brown, and there is a series of brown spots along each side. Adults may attain 77 cm (30 in.) in total length.

Geographic range and Distribution
The snake is found in a wide variety of locales, including areas of Western Malaysia, Cambodia, Thailand, Vietnam, Myanmar, India (Assam, Arunachal Pradesh, Miao - Changlang district), Southern China (incl. Hong Kong and Hainan), Indonesia (Java, Sulawesi, Sumatra, Borneo), Bangladesh, Cambodia, Laos, Singapore and Bali, and North Central Florida, USA.

Behavior
A very secretive snake, it hides in hollows and cracks of tree trunks during the day. Unlike most boigas, this species is a cathemeral snake, with which it is active at both day and night. It's quite nervous and will scuttle away at the slight disturbance. They rarely bite, however. It prefers rocky crevices and thin branches that are in plain sight.

Feeding Habits
Mostly observed hunting just before daybreak, it primarily feeds on lizards such as geckos and small skinks but they will also eat lizard eggs. This snake also frequents branches that are overhanging a water source, thus it may also devour fish in the process.

Venom
Being a rear-fanged snake, it is mildly venomous. The effects are the same as most boiga species but because of its size, it never poses any threat. There are no known or recorded fatalities as well.

References

 Boie, F. 1827 Bemerkungen über Merrem's Versuch eines Systems der Amphibien, 1. Lieferung: Ophidier. Isis van Oken, Jena, 20: 508–566.
 Boulenger, George A. 1890 The Fauna of British India, Including Ceylon and Burma. Reptilia and Batrachia. Taylor & Francis, London, xviii, 541 pp.
 Hnízdo, J. 1998 Boiga multomaculata (Boie 1827) im Terrarium. Elaphe 6 (1): 9-12

multomaculata
Snakes of Asia
Snakes of Southeast Asia
Reptiles of Bangladesh
Reptiles of Cambodia
Snakes of China
Snakes of India
Reptiles of Indonesia
Reptiles of Laos
Reptiles of Malaysia
Reptiles of Myanmar
Reptiles of Singapore
Reptiles of Thailand
Snakes of Vietnam
Reptiles of Borneo
Taxa named by Friedrich Boie
Reptiles described in 1827